Barker House is a historic home located at Michigan City, LaPorte County, Indiana.  It was built about 1900, and is a two-story, rectangular, Shingle Style / Prairie School style dwelling.  It sits on a brick foundation and has a hipped roof with hipped dormer and has a modified American Foursquare plan.  Also on the property are the contributing carriage house, dance studio, and garage.  The house and grounds are occupied by the Save the Dunes offices and Barker Woods Nature Preserve, which is managed by Shirley Heinze Land Trust.

It was listed on the National Register of Historic Places in 2001.

References

Houses on the National Register of Historic Places in Indiana
Shingle Style architecture in Indiana
Houses completed in 1900
Houses in LaPorte County, Indiana
National Register of Historic Places in LaPorte County, Indiana